Ockert Cilliers (born 21 April 1981) is a South African 400 m hurdler. Born in Vanderbijlpark, Cilliers now lives in Sydney (Australia). He is 1.84 m tall and weighs 74 kg.

His athletics career started in 1996 at school, where he also played rugby union. The rugby coach forced all players to take part in athletics as well. Cilliers chose 200m and 300m hurdles, and hurdling quickly became his primary interest.

He is a member of the Fenerbahçe S.K. athletics club in Turkey.

His current coach is Dr. Ria van den Berg.

Competition record

References

External links 

Focus on Athletes article from IAAF

South African male hurdlers
1981 births
Living people
People from Vanderbijlpark
Athletes (track and field) at the 2004 Summer Olympics
Olympic athletes of South Africa
Fenerbahçe athletes
Sportspeople from Gauteng